Oriental Institute may refer to a number of university faculties, departments, and institutes of Oriental studies:

United States
 Oriental Institute (Chicago), part of the University of Chicago

United Kingdom
 Faculty of Oriental Studies, part of the University of Oxford
 School of Oriental and African Studies, part of the University of London
 Oriental Institute, Woking, a late 19th-century educational establishment

Continental Europe
 Oriental Institute in Sarajevo, a research institute in Sarajevo, Bosnia
 Oriental Institute, ASCR, part of the Academy of Sciences of the Czech Republic in Prague
 Pontifical Oriental Institute, a Roman Catholic university in Rome, Italy
 Institut national des langues et civilisations orientales, Paris, France

Asia
 Oriental Institute, Maharaja Sayajirao University of Baroda, India
 Cama Oriental Institute, Mumbai, India
Bhandarkar Oriental Research Institute, Pune, India
Oriental Institute (Vladivostok), part of the Far Eastern Federal University, Vladivostok, Russia

See also
Oriental Institute of Science and Technology, Bhopal, India
Oriental Institute of Technology, Taiwan
Orient-Institut Beirut, Lebanon
Institute of Oriental Studies (disambiguation)
Oriental Research Institute (disambiguation)